Minister for Youth is a position in the government of Western Australia, currently held by Peter Tinley of the Labor Party. The position was first created after the 1983 state election, for the government of Brian Burke, and has existed in almost every government since then. The youth portfolio falls within the state government's Department of Local Government and Communities.

Titles
 25 February 1983 – 20 December 1984: Minister for Youth
 20 December 1984 – 25 February 1986: Minister for Youth Affairs
 25 February 1986 – present: Minister for Youth

List of ministers

See also
 Minister for Child Protection (Western Australia)
 Minister for Education (Western Australia)
 Minister for Seniors and Volunteering (Western Australia)

References
 David Black (2014), The Western Australian Parliamentary Handbook (Twenty-Third Edition). Perth [W.A.]: Parliament of Western Australia.

Youth
Minister for Youth